HMS Boxer was an  which served with the Royal Navy, launched on 28 November 1894. She spent several years operating with the Mediterranean Fleet and remained active during the First World War. She was sunk in a collision on 8 February 1918.

Construction and design
On 12 October 1893, the British Admiralty placed an order for three torpedo boat destroyers (Boxer and ) with the shipbuilder Thornycroft under the 1893–1894 shipbuilding programme for the Royal Navy as a follow-on to the two prototype destroyers ( and ) ordered from Thornycroft under the 1892–1893 programme.

As a torpedo boat, the planned armament was a single QF 12 pounder 12 cwt ( calibre) gun on a platform on the ship's conning tower (in practice the platform was also used as the ship's bridge), together with a secondary gun armament of three 6-pounder guns, and two 18 inch (450 mm) torpedo tubes. As a gunboat, one of the torpedo tubes could be removed to accommodate a further two six-pounders.

Displacement was  light and  full load. Two funnels were fitted. The ship's complement was 45 officers and men.

Boxer was laid down at Thornycroft's Chiswick shipyard, as Yard number 298, in February 1894. The ship was launched on 28 November 1894, with the naming ceremony performed by Miss Joan Thornycroft, daughter of the artist Hamo Thornycroft and niece of the yards founder John Isaac Thornycroft. She was completed in June 1895.

Service history
In May 1896 Boxer joined the Mediterranean Squadron, taking part in trials to determine the optimum colour scheme for torpedo craft in order to reduce the chance of being spotted in night attacks. She remained part of the Mediterranean Squadron in 1901. From 1 January 1902 she was commanded by Lieutenant Bertram Owen Frederick Phibbs. She underwent repairs to re-tube her boilers in 1902, following which Lieutenant Phibbs was back in command when she visited Lemnos in August.

Boxer moved back to Home waters in 1911, joining the 6th Destroyer Flotilla, a patrol flotilla equipped with older destroyers. On 30 August 1912 the Admiralty directed all destroyers were to be grouped into classes designated by letters based on contract speed and appearance. In March 1913 Boxer was a tender to the training establishment Excellent, being listed as in commission, but with a nucleus crew.

By June 1915, the First World War had brought a return to active service, with Boxer forming part of the Portsmouth Local Defence Flotilla. Boxer collided with the merchant ship SS St Patrick in the English Channel in bad weather on 8 February 1918, sinking as a result, with the loss of one crewman.

Notes

Citations

References

External links
 wrecksite.eu : HMS Boxer
 

 

Ardent-class destroyers
1894 ships
Ships built in Chiswick
Maritime incidents in 1918
Ships sunk in collisions
World War I shipwrecks in the English Channel
Ships built by John I. Thornycroft & Company